The 61st Annual Tony Award ceremony was held on June 10, 2007 at Radio City Music Hall, with CBS television broadcasting live. The cut-off date for eligibility was May 9, meaning that to be qualified for the 2006-2007 season, shows must have opened before or on this date.

Jane Krakowski and Taye Diggs announced the nominations on May 15, 2007.

This Tony Awards telecast won an Emmy Award, Outstanding Special Class Program, at the 59th Creative Arts Emmy Awards presented on September 8, 2007. Glenn Weiss, the director of the awards show, received a Directors Guild of America Awards nomination, Outstanding Directorial Achievement in Musical Variety (television). Spring Awakening, won 8 awards including Best Musical, the most of the night.

The ceremony
As with the 2006 Tony Award ceremony, there was no formal host and the show was emceed by the presenters.

Presenters

 
Jane Alexander
Christina Applegate
Zach Braff
Harry Connick Jr.
Claire Danes
Jeff Daniels
Brian Dennehy
Taye Diggs
Harvey Fierstein
Carla Gugino
Marvin Hamlisch
Marcia Gay Harden
Neil Patrick Harris
Anne Heche
Marg Helgenberger
Christian Hoff
Felicity Huffman
Mark Indelicato
Eddie Izzard
John Kander
Jane Krakowski
Angela Lansbury
Robert Sean Leonard
John Mahoney
Audra McDonald
Idina Menzel
Bebe Neuwirth
Cynthia Nixon
Donny Osmond
Bernadette Peters
David Hyde Pierce
Christopher Plummer
Daniel Reichard
Anika Noni Rose
Liev Schreiber
Kevin Spacey
J. Robert Spencer
Tommy Tune
John Turturro
Usher
Ben Vereen
Vanessa L. Williams
Patrick Wilson
Rainn Wilson
John Lloyd Young

Performances

The opening number showed the cast of A Chorus Line in rehearsal clothing dancing and singing "I Hope I Get It," outside of Radio City Music Hall accompanied by Marvin Hamlisch on the piano, with the cast then ending on the stage in full gold costumes performing "One".

The following musicals or performers performed:

110 in the Shade ("Raunchy") – Audra McDonald and John Cullum
Grey Gardens ("The Revolutionary Costume for Today") – Christine Ebersole
Spring Awakening (medley of "Mama Who Bore Me," "Mama Who Bore Me (Reprise)," "The Bitch of Living," and "Totally Fucked")* – Company
Curtains ("Show People") – Company
Mary Poppins (medley of "Chim Chim Cher-ee," "Step in Time," and "Anything Can Happen") – Company
Company ("Being Alive") – Raul Esparza
"American Idol" winner and replacement star Fantasia Barrino performed a song from The Color Purple in honor of Regional Theater Tony Winner Alliance Theater in Atlanta, GA, where the show premiered.

*(Because it was a live TV performance, some of the lyrics to "The Bitch of Living" and "Totally Fucked" were altered for that night's performance.)

Winners and nominees
Winners are in bold.

In Memoriam

Patrick Quinn
Kitty Carlisle Hart
Charles Nelson Reilly
Florence Klotz
Bob Fennell

Special Tony Award
Tony Award for Best Special Theatrical Event

Jay Johnson: The Two and Only!, Producers: Roger Alan Gindi, Stewart F. Lane & Bonnie Comley, Dan Whitten, Herbert Goldsmith Productions, Ken Grossman, Bob & Rhonda Silver, Michael A. Jenkins/Dallas Summer Musicals, Inc., Wetrock Entertainment
Kiki & Herb Alive on Broadway, Producers: David J. Foster, Jared Geller, Ruth Hendel, Jonathan Reinis, Inc., Billy Zavelson, Jamie Cesa, Anne Strickland Squadron, Jennifer Manocherian, Gary Allen, Melvin Honowitz

Regional Theatre Tony Award

Alliance Theatre Company, Atlanta, Georgia

Lifetime Achievement in the Theatre

Not awarded

Multiple nominations and awards

These productions had multiple nominations:

11 nominations: Spring Awakening 
10 nominations: The Coast of Utopia & Grey Gardens  
8 nominations: Curtains 
7 nominations: Legally Blonde & Mary Poppins  
6 nominations: Coram Boy & Journey's End
5 nominations: 110 in the Shade 
4 nominations: Inherit the Wind, LoveMusik & Radio Golf 
3 nominations: Company & Frost/Nixon 
2 nominations: A Chorus Line, Heartbreak House, The Little Dog Laughed & Talk Radio

The following productions received multiple awards.

8 wins: Spring Awakening 
7 wins: The Coast of Utopia
3 wins: Grey Gardens

See also
 Drama Desk Awards
 2007 Laurence Olivier Awards – equivalent awards for West End theatre productions
 Obie Award
 New York Drama Critics' Circle
 Theatre World Award
 Lucille Lortel Awards

References

External links
The Official Website of the Tony Awards

Tony Awards ceremonies
2007 theatre awards
2007 awards in the United States
2007 in New York City
2000s in Manhattan
Television shows directed by Glenn Weiss